Club de Fútbol Ardoi Fútbol Elkartea is a Spanish football team based in Zizur Mayor in the autonomous community of Navarre. Founded in 1987, it plays in Segunda División RFEF – Group 2. Its stadium is Estadio El Pinar II with a capacity of 1,000 seaters.

History 
In the 2016-17 season the club fought for remain its place in the Tercera División, and finally escaped from being relegated by finishing 16th.

Season to season

1 season in Segunda División RFEF
11 seasons in Tercera División

References

External links
Official Website  
Futbolme.com profile  
navarrafutbolclic.com profile
Ardoi Femenino at Txapeldunak

Football clubs in Navarre
Association football clubs established in 1987
Divisiones Regionales de Fútbol clubs
1987 establishments in Spain